Muhammadu Sa'ad Abubakar, CFR (born 24 August 1956) is the 20th Sultan of Sokoto. As Sultan of Sokoto, he is considered the spiritual leader of Northern Nigeria's Muslims.

Abubakar is the heir to the two century-old throne founded by his ancestor, Sheikh Usman Dan Fodio (1754–1817), leader of the Maliki school of Islam and the Qadiri branch of Sufism.

Early life

Family 

Sa'adu Abubakar was born on August 24, 1956, in Sokoto. He is the youngest son of the 17th Sultan, Sir Siddiq Abubakar III, who held the Sultanate for over fifty years.

Education 

Sa'adu Abubakar attended Barewa College in Zaria and proceeded to the Nigerian Defence Academy in 1975, where he was a member of the 18th Regular Course.

Military career 

Abubakar was commissioned a Second Lieutenant in 1977 and served in the elite Armoured Corps. He headed a presidential security unit of the Armoured Corps that guarded then military ruler, General Ibrahim Babangida in the late 1980s. Abubakar also commanded a battalion of African peacekeepers in Chad during the early 1980s, as part of the Organisation of African Unity's force and was military liaison officer for the Economic Community of West African States (ECOWAS) in the mid 1990s.

He was appointed Commanding Officer 241 Recce Battalion, Kaduna in 1993. From 1995 to 1999, he was ECOWAS military liaison officer and commanding officer, 231 Tank Battalion (ECOMOG Operations) in Sierra Leone, from 1999 to 2000. From 2003 to 2006, he served as Defence Attaché to Pakistan (also accredited for Iraq, Saudi Arabia, and Afghanistan) and retired as a Brigadier-General.

Sultan of Sokoto 

On 2 November 2006, Abubakar ascended the throne, following the death of his brother, Muhammadu Maccido, who died on ADC Airlines Flight 53.

Titles and honours 

As the Sultan of Sokoto, Abubakar is the leader of the Qadiriyya sufi order, which is the most important Muslim position in Nigeria and senior to the Emir of Kano, the leader of the most populous Tijaniyya sufi order. He is also the head of Jama'atu Nasril Islam (Society for the Support of Islam – JNI), and president-general of the Nigerian Supreme Council for Islamic Affairs (NSCIA).

In 2015, Muhammadu Sa'ad Abubakar IV was listed among the 10 recipients of the maiden edition of the Global Seal of Integrity (GSOI), an annual list, which is compiled and authored by two young Nigerians, Emmanuel Josh Omeiza and Godspower Oshodin, under the Global Youth Coalition for Integrity, for promoting integrity among the people and consequently, promoting the well-being of the universe.

On 22 August 2019, he was appointed as Co-Moderator of the Council of Religion for Peace (CRP).

References

External links 
 Profile: Muhammed Sa'adu Abubakar BBC News, Thursday, November 2, 2006, 10:30 GMT

1956 births
Living people
Commanders of the Order of the Federal Republic
21st-century caliphs
Nigerian Muslims
Sultans of Sokoto
Nigerian Sufi religious leaders
Nigerian expatriates in Pakistan
Nigerian generals
Nigerian Army officers
Nigerian Defence Academy alumni
Barewa College alumni